Lê Phước Tứ (born 15 April 1984) is a former Vietnamese footballer who last played for Becamex Bình Dương in the V.League 1. He was a regular member of the Vietnam national football team from 2008 to 2014.

On 12 November 2014, he announced his retirement from international football after the 2014 AFF Championship semi-final loss to Malaysia.

Honours
 AFF Championship (1): 2008
 V.League 1 (1): 2014
 V.League 2 (2): 2007, 2011
 Vietnamese National Cup (1): 2012
 Vietnamese Super Cup (1): 2009, 2013

References

External links

1984 births
Living people
People from Quảng Nam province
Vietnamese footballers
Association football central defenders
Vietnam international footballers
V.League 1 players
Xuan Thanh Saigon Cement FC players
Becamex Binh Duong FC players